"The Garden" is a song by the rock band Guns N' Roses released in 1991. It appears on the album Use Your Illusion I and features alternating lead vocals between Axl Rose and Alice Cooper.

Background
"The Garden" was written before Guns N' Roses released Appetite for Destruction in 1987, but was not included on that album. It was composed by Axl Rose, Del James and West Arkeen.

The song marks the second collaboration between Alice Cooper and Guns N' Roses, as the group had previously recorded a cover of Cooper's song "Under My Wheels" (on which Cooper and Rose shared vocal duties) for the soundtrack of the 1988 film The Decline of Western Civilization Part II: The Metal Years.

According to Slash, as Rose's delivery while recording resembled Alice Cooper, the band decided to invite him as a guest. Cooper, who was also in Los Angeles at the time, got an invitation to go to the studio, and accepted to guest after hearing the track, recording his part three times. Rose's friend Shannon Hoon, the lead singer of Blind Melon, is also featured.

Music video 
The song was never officially released as a single or sent to radio stations as a promo. However, the band did film and release a promo video to music video networks in 1993. It appeared as the B-side to the single Estranged in December 1993.

The clip depicts various band members in sections of New York City, specifically Times Square and Washington Square Park. It was released to promote the Use Your Illusion Tour. Due to various scenes taking place in strip clubs, the video was not shown very much on MTV. It appears on the band's Welcome to the Videos.

Personnel
Guns N' Roses
W. Axl Rose – co-lead vocals, backing vocals
Slash – lead guitar, rhythm guitar, acoustic guitar, slide guitar
Duff McKagan – bass
Matt Sorum – drums, percussion
Additional musicians
Alice Cooper – co-lead vocals
Shannon Hoon – backing vocals
West Arkeen – acoustic guitar

References

Guns N' Roses songs
Alice Cooper songs
1992 singles
Songs written by Axl Rose
Songs written by Del James
Songs written by West Arkeen
Art rock songs
1991 songs
Geffen Records singles